Black Ships Ate the Sky is a 2006 album by the UK-based musical ensemble Current 93. The album features numerous guest vocalists, such as Anohni, Bonnie 'Prince' Billy, Marc Almond, and Shirley Collins. It features nine versions of the 1816 Appalachian tune Idumæa, with lyrics of a 1763 Methodist hymn by Charles Wesley, each featuring vocals by a different artist.  The album was issued in digipak packaging, with a 56-page booklet containing liner notes, lyrics, photographs, and credits.

In order to assist with funding for the album, customers were able to pre-order a copy. These 'subscribers' received a mention in the liner notes, as well as a limited edition extra CD, entitled I Am Black Ship, consisting of alternate versions of the tracks from Black Ships Ate the Sky.

The track "Sunset (The Death of Thumbelina)" was featured on the National Public Radio program All Songs Considered on 10 August 2006.

Track listing

Black Ships Ate the Sky

I Am Black Ship

Personnel
David Tibet – voice, guitars (track 19), electric leaking voices passim, mixing
Michael Cashmore – guitars (tracks 1, 3, 6, 7, 11, 12, 14, and 20), slide guitar (track 3), bass guitar (track 20)
Ben Chasny – guitar (track 2, 4, 9, 17, and 18)
John Contreras - cello
Steven Stapleton - goatheard, mixing
Marc Almond – voice (track 1)
Bonnie 'Prince' Billy – voice and banjo and tambura (track 5)
Baby Dee – voice and harp (track 8)
Ida Mercer – cello (track 8)
Anohni – voice (tracks 10 and 15), harp (track 15)
Clodagh Simonds – voice and psaltery and zither and harmonium (track 13)
Cosey Fanni Tutti – voice and musics (track 14)
Chris Carter – musics (track 14)
Andria Degens – voice and appalachian dulcimer and harmonica (track 16)
Shirley Collins – voice (track 21)
Iris Bishop – concertina (track 21)
Amy Phillips – subliminal threnodic voice (tracks 14 and 19)
William Breeze – viola (tracks 17 and 19)
William Basinski – 9.28.82 galaxial compositions (tracks 12 and 18)
Colin Potter – mixing
Mark Logan – astral projection production
Al Cisneros – astral projection production
Tina Gordon – astral projection production
John Contreras - cello arrangements

Black Ships Eat the Sky 
In December 2006, Current 93 released an "alternate version" of the album titled Black Ships Eat the Sky.  This limited edition record features different versions and a different mix of the album, which Tibet described as "far more intimate and more emphatically acoustic than the original version."  The songs of Black Ships Eat the Sky have the same titles (unlisted on the CD cover itself - only available online) as their …Ate the Sky counterparts, with the exception that track 20 is titled "Why Cæsar is Burning Part I".

References

External links 
 Current 93's home page

Current 93 albums
Durtro albums
2006 albums